Abraham Jan (Arjan) van der Schaft (born 1955) is  a full professor of systems and control theory at the Johann Bernoulli Institute of Mathematics and Computer Science, University of Groningen.  He is notable for his contributions to network modelling and control of complex systems, specifically in the areas of Port-Hamiltonian systems, passivity-based control, nonlinear H∞ control and hybrid systems. He is a Fellow of the IEEE.

Career
Arjan van der Schaft received the undergraduate and Ph.D. degrees in Mathematics from the University of Groningen, Netherlands, in 1979 and 1983, respectively. In 1982 he joined the Department of Applied Mathematics, University of Twente, Enschede, where he was appointed as a full professor in Mathematical Systems and Control Theory in 2000. In September 2005 he returned to Groningen as a full professor in Mathematics.

In 2006 he was an invited speaker at the International Congress of Mathematicians in Madrid.

Van der Schaft has served as Associate Editor for Systems & Control Letters, Journal of Nonlinear Science, SIAM Journal on Control and Optimization, and the IEEE Transactions on Automatic Control. Currently he is Associate Editor for the Journal of Geometric Mechanics, and Editor-at-Large for the European Journal of Control.

Books
 System Theoretic Descriptions of Physical Systems (1984)
 Variational and Hamiltonian Control Systems (1987, with P.E. Crouch)
 Nonlinear Dynamical Control Systems (1990, with H. Nijmeijer)
 L2-Gain and Passivity Techniques in Nonlinear Control (2000)
 An Introduction to Hybrid Dynamical Systems (2000, with J.M. Schumacher)
 Modeling and Control of Complex Physical Systems: the Port-Hamiltonian Approach (Geoplex Consortium, 2009)

Honors and awards
Fellow of the Institute of Electrical and Electronics Engineers since 2002.
The paper "A.J. van der Schaft, L2-gain analysis of nonlinear systems and nonlinear state feedback H∞ control, TAC. AC-37, pp. 770–784, 1992" was the Dutch research paper in international scientific journals within the Technical Sciences that obtained the largest number of citations during the evaluation period 1994–1998.
Invited semi-plenary speaker at the International Congress of Mathematicians, Madrid, 22–30 August 2006: From networks models to geometry: a new view on Hamiltonian systems. 
SICE Takeda Best Paper Prize 2008 for "An approximation method for the stabilizing solution of the Hamilton-Jacobi equation for integrable systems", a Hamiltonian perturbation approach', Transactions of the Society of Instrument and Control Engineers (SICE), 43, pp. 572–580, 2007.

References

1955 births
Living people
Control theorists
Dutch electrical engineers
Dutch mathematicians
University of Groningen alumni
Academic staff of the University of Groningen
Academic staff of the University of Twente
Fellow Members of the IEEE